Colmar Agglomération is the communauté d'agglomération, an intercommunal structure, centred on the city of Colmar. It is located in the Haut-Rhin department, in the Grand Est region, northeastern France. It was created in November 2003. Its seat is in Colmar. Its area is 244.4 km2. Its population was 113,654 in 2017, of which 69,105 in Colmar proper.

Composition
The communauté d'agglomération consists of the following 20 communes:

Andolsheim
Bischwihr
Colmar
Fortschwihr
Herrlisheim-près-Colmar
Horbourg-Wihr
Houssen
Ingersheim
Jebsheim
Muntzenheim
Niedermorschwihr
Porte-du-Ried
Sainte-Croix-en-Plaine
Sundhoffen
Turckheim
Walbach
Wettolsheim
Wickerschwihr
Wintzenheim
Zimmerbach

References

Colmar
Colmar